Huddersfield Town's 1933–34 campaign was a season of triumph for a resurgent Huddersfield Town. Following the top 6 finishes in the previous 3 seasons, Town managed to finish in 2nd place in Division 1. Town would finish behind Arsenal, who win their second consecutive championship and would emulate Town's 1920s achievement the next season.

Squad at the start of the season

Review
After a resurgence in form in the last few seasons, Town's form continued its upturn in form. 5 of their players, Wilf Bott, Charlie Luke, Dave Mangnall, George McLean and Jack Smith all scored more than 10 goals during the season, helping Town become the top goalscorers in the league during the season. They were still in the title race until a defeat by Arsenal at Highbury in April. They would finish 2nd, just 3 points behind the Gunners, although if they had beaten them, then they would have won the title by a point.

Squad at the end of the season

Results

Division One

FA Cup

Appearances and goals

Huddersfield Town A.F.C. seasons
Huddersfield Town F.C.